Jitpur istamrar is a village in Rewari tehsil, Rewari district, Haryana, India. It is one of 274 villages in Rewari tehsil. Nearby railway station of Jitpur istamrar is Rewari.

Adjacent villages
Khijuri
Masani
Dungarwas
Nikhri
Masani
Khaliawas
Bhatsana
Niganiawas
Raliawas

References

Villages in Rewari district